William J. Oliphant (1845–1930) was an American Confederate States Army veteran and photographer from Austin, Texas. He published the first photographs of buffalo hunts in North America.

Early life
William James Oliphant was born on September 30, 1845 in Lawrenceburg, Indiana. His father, William S. Oliphant (1813-1890), was a jeweller. His mother was Jane (Van Zile) Oliphant (1822-1867). He moved to Texas with his parents when he was seven years old, in 1853. The family settled in Austin, where his father's jewellery store was located on Pecan Street, now known as Sixth Street.

He studied photography under Alexander Gardner (1845–1930) and Timothy H. O'Sullivan (1840-1882) in Washington, D.C.

Career
During the American Civil War of 1861-1865, Oliphant served as a private in the Company G of the Sixth Texas Infantry Regiment, also known as the "Travis Rifles," of the Confederate States Army (CSA). He served in the Battle of Missionary Ridge, the Battle of Pickett's Mill, and the Battle of Atlanta (where he was wounded and caught by Union forces). He was in prison at Camp Chase for nearly a year, from July 1864 to March 1865.

Shortly after the war, Oliphant became a photographer in Austin. His studio was above his father's jewellery shop at 117 Pecan Street. Indeed, together with Hamilton B. Hillyer (1835–1903), he was one of the earliest photographers in Austin to have a studio in the city. Additionally, he published photographs taken by other photographers. He is perhaps best known for publishing the earliest photographs of buffalo hunts in the United States. They are known as the Life on the Frontier series, taken by George Robertson in 1874.

From the 1880s to the 1920s, Oliphant worked for the government. He worked for the Texas Comptroller of Public Accounts from 1881 to 1886, the Internal Revenue Service from 1887 to 1890, and for the Travis County Tax Assessor's Office from 1905 to 1927.

Personal life
Oliphant resided at the Oliphant-Walker House in Hyde Park, a suburb of Austin. He married twice. His first wife was Lizzie J. Walker (1848-1873). After she died in 1873, he got remarried to Alice Olive Townsend (1852-1908) in 1877. They had four children. One of his daughters married Walter Prescott Webb, a Texas historian.

Death and legacy
Oliphant died on November 11, 1930 in Austin, Texas. He was buried at the Oakwood Cemetery in Austin, Texas.

The William J. Oliphant chapter of the United Daughters of the Confederacy in Austin, Texas is named in his honor.

Bibliography
Oliphant, William J. Only a Private: A Texan Remembers the Civil War. Edited by James M. McCaffrey. Houston, Texas: Halcyon Press, Ltd. 2004.

References

External links

1845 births
1930 deaths
People from Lawrenceburg, Indiana
People from Austin, Texas
Confederate States Army personnel
Northern-born Confederates
American photographers
Bison hunting
Burials at Oakwood Cemetery (Austin, Texas)